XHEDI-FM is a community radio station on 106.1 FM in Oaxaca de Juárez, Oaxaca. It is known as Stereo Uno and owned by the civil association Esperanza, Destino e Identidad Global, A.C. Stereo Uno broadcasts from a transmitter in Santa Cruz Amilpas.

History
Esperanza, Destino e Identidad Global was approved for its concession on October 4, 2017, after applying in November 2015. The station signed on November 12, 2018. It originally broadcast from Santa Cruz Amilpas before being approved to use Cerro el Fortín, a mountaintop home to major Oaxaca TV stations, in 2022.

References

Radio stations in Oaxaca
Community radio stations in Mexico
Radio stations established in 2018
2018 establishments in Mexico